John Richard Batchelor FRCPath, FRCP (4 October 1931 – 21 December 2015), known as Richard, was a British immunologist, specialising in transplant immunology.

Batchelor was born in Woking, Surrey, on 4 October 1931 to Esme (née Cornwall) and Basil Batchelor, and was raised in Madras, India. He was educated at Marlborough College and obtained his medical qualifications from the University of Cambridge.

He was Professor of Immunology at the Royal Postgraduate Medical School, from 1979 to 1994; and afterwards Professor Emeritus.

He died on 21 December 2015.

References

External links 
 

1931 births
2015 deaths
Place of death missing
Fellows of the Royal College of Pathologists

Fellows of the Royal College of Physicians
British immunologists
People from Woking